"Hotter than Hell" is a song by the American hard rock band Kiss, released on their second album of the same name in 1974. It was written by the band's rhythm guitarist Paul Stanley, and displays the heavy influence of the band Free. Despite being rarely performed during the years, "Hotter than Hell" has appeared on many of the band's albums. It has also appeared as a B-side to the album's lone single, "Let Me Go, Rock 'n' Roll".

Background
"Hotter than Hell", as Stanley has stated, was basically a rewrite of the Free song "All Right Now", due to the fact that Stanley was a big fan of Free and the song meant a lot to him.

Stanley described the story of the song: "[It] was written about an encounter with somebody in a bar, and then at the end of the song I didn't know quite how to end it so I came up with this riff that was kind of like a Black Sabbath kind of riff and we tacked that on."

Live performances
"Hotter than Hell" has been performed during the following tours, but was dropped from the Destroyer Tour setlist and did not return until the Revenge Tour in 1992. The song was returned again to the setlist for the Kiss/Aerosmith co-headlined Rocksimus Maximus Tour/World Domination Tour. It was again dropped from the Sonic Boom Over Europe Tour and has not been performed since.

During the TV movie Kiss Meets the Phantom of the Park, the "evil" Kiss performed a version of the song, retitled "Rip and Destroy", in order to incite a crowd to riot.

Appearances
"Hotter than Hell" has appeared on the following Kiss albums:

Hotter than Hell - studio version
Alive! - live version
The Originals - studio version
Double Platinum - studio version
The Box Set - studio version
The Very Best of Kiss - studio version
The Best of Kiss: The Millennium Collection - studio version
Gold - studio version
Kiss Chronicles: 3 Classic Albums - studio version
Kiss Alive! 1975–2000 - Alive! version
Kiss Alive 35 - live version
Jigoku-Retsuden - re-recorded studio version
Ikons - studio version
Sonic Boom (Bonus CD: Compilation Kiss Klassics) - re-recorded studio version

Other appearances:
B-side for the "Let Me Go, Rock 'n' Roll" single

Personnel
Paul Stanley – lead vocals, rhythm guitar
Gene Simmons – bass, backing vocals
Peter Criss – drums
Ace Frehley – lead guitar

References

Kiss (band) songs
1974 songs
Songs written by Paul Stanley